Around the World Live is a video by English rock band Jethro Tull, released in 2013. It comprises in-concert footage recorded by the band from 1970 to 2005.

DVD track listing

DVD 1

Live at the Isle of Wight Festival 1970
 My Sunday Feeling
 My God
Live in Tampa, FL 1976
 Quartet (Intro)
 Thick As A Brick
 Wond'ring Aloud
 Crazed Institution
 Barre/Drum Solo
 To Cry You A Song/A New Day Yesterday/Bourée/God Rest Ye Merry Gentlemen
 Living In The Past/Thick As A Brick
 A New Day Yesterday (Reprise)
 Too Old To Rock 'n' Roll, Too Young To Die
 Minstrel In The Gallery
 Excerpt from Beethoven's Symphony No. 9 (Molto Vivace)
Live in Munich 1980
 Aqualung
 Dark Ages
 Home
 Orion
 Too Old To Rock 'n' Roll, Too Young To Die
 Cross-Eyed Mary
 Minstrel In The Gallery
 Locomotive Breath
 Dambusters March

DVD 2
Live in Dortmund 1982
 Pussy Willow
 Heavy Horses (Live at the Loreley, Germany 1986)
 Black Sunday (Live in Santiago, Chile 1996)
 Roots To Branches
 Rare And Precious
 Thick As A Brick
 In The Grip Of Stronger Stuff
 Dangerous Veils
 Aqualung/Aquadiddly
 Nothing Is Easy
 Bourée
 In The Moneylenders' Temple
 My God
 Locomotive Breath

DVD 3
Live in Hilversum, Holland 1999

 Some Day The Sun Won't Shine For You
 Thick As A Brick
 Locomotive Breath
 The Secret Language Of Birds
 Dot Com
 Fat Man
 Bourée
 In The Grip Of Stronger Stuff
 Interview with Ian Anderson, 1999
 Cross-Eyed Mary
 Hunt By Numbers
 My Sunday Feeling (Live at Montreux 2003)
 Some Day The Sun Won't Shine For You
 Life Is A Long Song
 Living In The Past

DVD 4
Live in Lugano, Switzerland 2005

 Aqualung (Intro)
 For A Thousand Mothers
 Nothing Is Easy
 Jack In The Green
 Serenade To A Cuckoo
 Beggar's Farm
 Boris Dancing
 Weathercock
 We Five Kings
 Up To Me
 Bourée
 Mother Goose
 Empty Café
 Farm On The Freeway
 Hymn 43
 A New Day Yesterday
 Budapest
 Aqualung
 Locomotive Breath
 Protect And Survive
 Cheerio

Personnel
 Ian Anderson – vocals, flute, acoustic guitar
 Martin Barre – electric guitar
 John Evan – keyboards
 David Palmer – keyboards, saxophone
 Peter Vettese – keyboards
 Andrew Giddings – keyboards
 Glenn Cornick – bass guitar
 John Glascock – bass guitar
 Dave Pegg – bass guitar
 Jonathan Noyce – bass guitar
 Clive Bunker – drums
 Barriemore Barlow – drums
 Gerry Conway – drums
 Doane Perry – drums

See also 
 Living with the Past
 Live At Madison Square Garden 1978

External links 
 Official Around the World Live DVD Page

Jethro Tull (band) video albums
Progressive rock video albums
Live video albums
Jethro Tull (band) live albums
2013 video albums
2013 live albums